Government accounting refers to the process of recording and the management of all financial transactions incurred by the government which includes its income and expenditures.

Various governmental accounting systems are used by various public sector entities. In the United States, for instance, there are two levels of government which follow different accounting standards set forth by independent, private sector boards. At the federal level, the Federal Accounting Standards Advisory Board (FASAB) sets forth the accounting standards to follow. Similarly, there is the Governmental Accounting Standards Board (GASB) for state and local level government.

Public vs. private accounting

Objectives

The unique objectives of government accounting do not preclude the use of the double entry accounting system. There can, however, be other significant differences with private sector accounting practices, especially those that are intended to arrive at a net income result. The objectives for which government entities apply accountancy that can be organized in two main categories:
- The accounting of activities for accountability purposes. In other words, the representatives of the public, and officials appointed by them, must be accountable to the public for powers and tasks delegated. The public, who have no other choice but to delegate, are in a position that differs significantly from that of shareholders and therefore need financial information, to be supplied by accounting systems, that is applicable and relevant to them and their purposes.
- Decision-making purposes. The relevant role-players, especially officials and representatives, need financial information that is accounted, organized and presented for the objectives of their decision-making. These objectives bear, in many instances, no relation to net income results but are rather about service delivery and efficiency. The taxpayer, a very significant group, simply wants to pay as little as possible taxes for the essential services for which money is being coerced by law.

Sources (not directly quoted but used in synthesis):

1. Conradie, J.M. The applicability of Generally Accepted Accounting Practice in the Central Government of South Africa (English summary of a thesis written in another language) University of Pretoria, 1993.

2. Conradie, J.M. Die toepaslikheid van Algemeen Aanvaarde Rekeningkundige Praktyk in die Sentrale Owerheid van Suid-Afrika. Universiteit van Pretoria, 1993. (Original full text of the summary.)

See also
Classification of the Functions of Government

Government
Types of accounting